Jennifer Moore (born 31 August 1995) is an English badminton player.

Achievements

BWF International Challenge/Series (7 titles, 8 runners-up) 
Women's doubles

Mixed doubles

  BWF International Challenge tournament
  BWF International Series tournament
  BWF Future Series tournament

References

External links 
 

1995 births
Living people
English female badminton players